Anonychomyrma gilberti is a species of ant in the genus Anonychomyrma. Described by Forel in 1902, the species is endemic to Australia and New Guinea.

References

Anonychomyrma
Hymenoptera of Australia
Insects of New Guinea
Insects described in 1902
Taxa named by Auguste Forel